Victor Patrașco (born 26 September 1998) is a Moldovan former football player who played as a left-back. He also holds Russian citizenship as Viktor Viktorovich Patrashko.

Club career
He made his debut in the Russian Premier League for FC Ufa on 15 April 2017 in a game against FC Amkar Perm.

On 18 June 2019, he signed a two-year contract with FC Shinnik Yaroslavl.

Career statistics

Club

References

External links

1998 births
Footballers from Chișinău
Living people
Moldovan footballers
Moldova youth international footballers
Association football defenders
FC Academia Chișinău players
Moldovan Super Liga players
Moldovan expatriate footballers
Expatriate footballers in Russia
Russian Premier League players
FC Ufa players
FC Luch Vladivostok players
FC Shinnik Yaroslavl players